The year 1724 in architecture involved some significant architectural events and new buildings.

Events
Work recommences on the Salon d'Hercule at Versailles under Jacques Gabriel, after a break caused by the death of King Louis XIV of France in 1715.

Buildings and structures

Buildings completed

 Cannons, a house in Edgware, Middlesex, England, built for James Brydges, 1st Duke of Chandos with façades designed by James Gibbs.
 Maids of Honour Row, terraced houses on Richmond Green, Richmond, Surrey, England.
 Chester Courthouse in Pennsylvania (North America).
 Shire Hall, Monmouth, Great Britain.
 Church of St. Edmund, Dudley, England.
 St. Stephanus, Bork, Germany.
 Cluj Jesuit Church in Transylvania (Romania).
 Stavropoleos Monastery in Bucharest, Romania.
 Rebuilt Sam Poo Kong temple in Semarang, Java.

Awards
 Grand Prix de Rome, architecture: Jean-Pierre Le Tailleur de Boncourt.

Births
June 8 – John Smeaton, English civil engineer (died 1792)
October – Hans Næss, Danish architect (died 1795)
date unknown – Julien-David Le Roy, French architect and archaeologist (died 1803)

Deaths
January 24 – William Dickinson, English architect (born c.1670)
March 8 – Enrico Zuccalli, Swiss architect working for the Wittelsbach regents of Bavaria and Cologne (born c.1642)
date unknown – Pierre Cailleteau, French architect and interior designer (born 1655)

References

architecture
Years in architecture
18th-century architecture